Chellington is a village and former civil parish, now in the parish of Carlton and Chellington, in the Bedford district, in the ceremonial county of Bedfordshire, England, situated approximately  north-west of Bedford town centre. In 1931 the parish had a population of 78.

Chellington was recorded in the Domesday Book of 1086 as a parish within the Hundred of Willey. On 1 April 1934 the separate parishes of Chellington and Carlton merged to become one parish named "Carlton and Chellington".

References

External links

Villages in Bedfordshire
Former civil parishes in Bedfordshire
Borough of Bedford